The Pharmacy Museum (drugsrore-mesuem) in Lviv, Ukraine, was opened in 1966 in the building of an old drugstore at the corner of the Market Square. It is the working drugstore and museum (two in one), the oldest of the existing pharmacies in Lviv. The museum consists of 16 rooms which exhibit antique pharmaceutical appliances, prescriptions, medicines, dishes, a library of pharmacy-related books, and even a reconstructed alchemy workshop.

History 
The drugstore was established in 1735 by Wilhelm Natorp, a military pharmacist. It was called "Under the Black Eagle".

See also 
History of pharmacy

References

External links 
 Pharmacy-museum in Lviv. Lviv, Kameniar, 1989.

Museums in Lviv
1735 establishments in Europe
Pharmacy museums
1966 establishments in Ukraine
Museums established in 1966
Medical and health organizations based in Ukraine